B. Jay Becker (May 5, 1904 – October 9, 1987) was an American lawyer and bridge champion from Flushing, Queens.

Biography
He was born and raised in Philadelphia, where he trained as a lawyer at Temple Law School, graduating in 1929; he lived there until 1937. Turning to a career in contract bridge, he became a top player, columnist and teacher, twice winning world championships in the Bermuda Bowl events of 1951 and 1953. After playing on the Vanderbilt Trophy-winning team at age 81 in 1976, he was both the oldest player to win the Vanderbilt teams tournament and the winner of the greatest number of "national" (North American) team championships. Alan Truscott described him as "Among the handful of American experts who are legitimate candidates for the title of 'best player of all time.'"

A conservative bidder, Becker had a careful style, avoided most bidding conventions and relied instead on his technical skills and judgment; he was admired and respected for his quiet demeanor at the table.

Over the years, Becker managed three New York bridge clubs (the Cavendish 1942–47, the New York Bridge Whist 1948–50 and the Regency 1951–56) and for thirty years was a nationally syndicated columnist. A contributor to The Bridge World and the ACBL Bulletin, he was a member of the Editorial Advisory Board of The Official Encyclopedia of Bridge and a member of the ACBL Laws Commission.

Becker was inducted into the ACBL Hall of Fame in 1995.

Both of Becker's sons, Mike and Steve, are also prominent in the bridge world. They divided his legacy—Mike is also an ACBL Hall of Fame player; Steve took over the syndicated column.

Books  

 Check Pinochle: official rules and conventions, Morton Wild and Becker (New York Bridge Whist Club, 1950), pamphlet(?), 
 Becker on Bridge (Grosset & Dunlap, 1971), 127 pp.,

Bridge accomplishments

Honors

 ACBL Hall of Fame, 1995

Awards

 Fishbein Trophy (1) 1972

Wins

 Bermuda Bowl (2) 1951, 1953
 North American Bridge Championships (31)
 Masters Individual (2) 1937, 1948 
 von Zedtwitz Life Master Pairs (2) 1935, 1964 
 Wernher Open Pairs (1) 1938 
 Blue Ribbon Pairs (1) 1963 
 Open Pairs (1928-1962) (2) 1946, 1962 
 Vanderbilt (8) 1944, 1945, 1951, 1955, 1956, 1957, 1959, 1981 
 Masters Team of 4 (1) 1936 
 Reisinger (8) 1932, 1939, 1942, 1943, 1950, 1953, 1954, 1956 
 Spingold (6) 1938, 1944, 1947, 1952, 1957, 1972

Runners-up

 Bermuda Bowl (2) 1958, 1965
 North American Bridge Championships
 Masters Individual (4) 1934, 1941, 1949, 1955 
 Hilliard Mixed Pairs (1) 1932 
 Open Pairs (1928-1962) (1) 1949 
 Vanderbilt (7) 1937, 1938, 1941, 1949, 1950, 1952, 1964 
 Spingold (1) 1932 
 Mitchell Board-a-Match Teams (2) 1959, 1963 
 Chicago Mixed Board-a-Match (5) 1936, 1958, 1960, 1967, 1972 
 Reisinger (3) 1933, 1944, 1951 
 Spingold (7) 1941, 1943, 1950, 1955, 1960, 1965, 1968

References

External links
 
 
 

1904 births
1987 deaths
American contract bridge players
Bermuda Bowl players
Contract bridge writers
Temple University Beasley School of Law alumni
20th-century American lawyers
Lawyers from Philadelphia
People from Flushing, Queens